Lecanora helmutii is a rare species of corticolous (bark-dwelling), crustose lichen in the family Lecanoraceae. Found in Tasmania, it was formally described as a new species in 2018 by Sergio Pérez-Ortega and Gintaras Kantvilas. The type specimen was collected from the eastern side of Stanley Highway, where it was found growing on the bark of Banksia marginata in a coastal swampy woodland dominated by Melaleuca. It is only known from the type collection. Other associated lichens include Austroparmelina pseudorelicina, Bactropsora paludicola, Menegazzia subpertusa, Pannaria elixii, and Parmotrema perlatum. The species epithet honours Austrian lichenologist Helmut Mayrhofer.

Characteristics of the lichen, including biatorine apothecia (consisting of only a pale, not carbonized proper margin and always lack a thalline margin), Lecanora-type asci, and simple, translucent ascospores, place it in the Lecanora symmicta species group within the genus Lecanora. It contains usnic acid and zeorin as lichen products; all standard chemical spot tests on the thallus are negative.

See also
List of Lecanora species

References

helmutii
Lichen species
Lichens described in 2018
Lichens of Australia
Taxa named by Gintaras Kantvilas
Species known from a single specimen